Bates County is a county located in the west central part of the U.S. state of Missouri, two counties south of the Missouri River and is part of the Kansas City metropolitan area. As of the 2020 census, the population was 16,042. Its county seat is Butler.  The county was organized in 1841 and named after Frederick Bates, the second Governor of Missouri.

This mostly rural county has an overwhelmingly ethnic European-American population, which has declined in number since the early 20th century as people have moved to cities.

History
The borderlands of Kansas and Missouri were battlegrounds for insurgents during the American Civil War, with raids going back and forth across the border. Bates County is noted as the site for the first combat engagement during the war of African-American soldiers serving with the Union and against Confederate forces, which occurred on October 28–29, 1862. The First Kansas Colored Division (part of the state militia) fought Confederate guerrillas at the Battle of Island Mound four miles north of present-day Rich Hill, Missouri, and the Union forces won.

The Kansas soldiers were badly outnumbered but stood their ground, fighting valiantly. The skirmish was covered by The New York Times, which noted the men's bravery at a time when many people questioned whether former slaves could make good soldiers. Their heroic action preceded President Abraham Lincoln's announcement of the Emancipation Proclamation in January 1863 and establishment of the United States Colored Troops.

Following a massacre of men and boys and the burning of Lawrence, Kansas, by Confederate bushwhackers in the summer of 1863, the United States General Ewing ordered the evacuation of the civilian population from rural areas of Bates and nearby counties except for within a mile of certain Union-controlled cities, in order to cut off sources of support for Confederate insurgents. This was done under Order No. 11. The county had been a base of Confederate guerrillas. But, Ewing's order generated outrage and added to support of guerrillas in some areas.

This mostly rural county continued to support agriculture in the decades after the Civil War. Since the early 20th century, population has declined as people have moved to cities for work.

Legacy and honors
A statue commemorating the Battle of Island Mound was installed on the north lawn of the county courthouse in Butler, seven miles from the skirmish site.
The skirmish area has been preserved since 2012 as the Battle of Island Mound State Historic Site, and its historic prairie is being restored.
The Battle of Island Mound (2014) is a short documentary film made in cooperation with the Missouri Department of Natural Resources; it won two Emmy Awards in 2015 for historic documentary and cinematography.

Geography

Adjacent counties
Cass County  (north)
Henry County  (northeast)
St. Clair County  (southeast)
Vernon County  (south)
Linn County, Kansas  (west)
Miami County, Kansas  (northwest)

Major highways
 Interstate 49
 U.S. Route 71
 Route 18
 Route 52

Demographics

As of the census of 2000, there were 16,653 people, 6,511 households, and 4,557 families residing in the county.  The population density was 20 people per square mile (8/km2).  There were 7,247 housing units at an average density of 8 per square mile (3/km2).  The racial makeup of the county was 97.33% White, 0.61% Black or African American, 0.59% Native American, 0.15% Asian, 0.01% Pacific Islander, 0.39% from other races, and 0.92% from two or more races. Approximately 1.07% of the population were Hispanic or Latino of any race.

There were 6,511 households, out of which 32.30% had children under the age of 18 living with them, 58.80% were married couples living together, 7.60% had a female householder with no husband present, and 30.00% were non-families. 26.10% of all households were made up of individuals, and 13.90% had someone living alone who was 65 years of age or older.  The average household size was 2.51 and the average family size was 3.02.

In the county, the population was spread out, with 26.50% under the age of 18, 7.50% from 18 to 24, 26.00% from 25 to 44, 22.60% from 45 to 64, and 17.40% who were 65 years of age or older.  The median age was 38 years. For every 100 females there were 95.20 males.  For every 100 females age 18 and over, there were 91.50 males.

The median income for a household in the county was $30,731, and the median income for a family was $36,470. Males had a median income of $30,298 versus $19,772 for females. The per capita income for the county was $15,477.  About 11.50% of families and 14.50% of the population were below the poverty line, including 18.30% of those under age 18 and 14.10% of those age 65 or over.

Religion
According to the Association of Religion Data Archives County Membership Report (2010), Bates County is regarded as being a part of the Bible Belt, with evangelical Protestantism being the most predominant religion. The most predominant denominations among residents in Bates County who adhere to a religion are Southern Baptists (34.21%), United Methodists (15.78%), and Christian Churches and Churches of Christ (14.48%).

2020 Census

Education

Public schools
Adrian R-III School District – Adrian
Adrian Elementary School (PK-05)
Adrian High School (06-12)
Ballard R-II School District – Butler
Ballard Elementary School (PK-06)
Ballard High School (07-12)
Butler R-V School District – Butler
Butler Elementary School (K-06)
Butler High School (07-12)
Hume R-VIII School District – Hume
Hume Elementary School (PK-05)
Hume High School (06-12)
Miami R-I School District – Amoret
Miami Elementary School (K-06)
Miami High School (07-12)
Rich Hill R-IV School District – Rich Hill
Rich Hill Elementary School (K-05)
Rich Hill High School (06-12)

Private schools
Zion Lutheran School – Rockville (02-09) – Lutheran

Public libraries
Butler Public Library  
Rich Hill Memorial Library

Politics

Local
Politics are divided at the local level in Bates County. Republicans hold a majority of the elected positions in the county.

State

Bates County is split between three legislative districts in the Missouri House of Representatives, all of which are held by Republicans.

District 56 — Michael Davis (R-Kansas City). Consists of unincorporated areas in the northwestern quadrant of the county south of Drexel.

District 57 — Rodger Reedy (R-Windsor).  Consists of unincorporated areas in the northern part of the county south of Archie and Creighton.

District 126 — Patricia Pike (R-Adrian). Consists of most of the entire county.

All of Bates County is a part of Missouri's 31st Senatorial District in the Missouri Senate and is currently represented by Rick Brattin (R-Harrisonville).

Federal
All of Bates County is included in Missouri's 4th Congressional District and is currently represented by Vicky Hartzler (R-Harrisonville) in the U.S. House of Representatives. Hartzler was elected to a sixth term in 2020 over Democratic challenger Lindsey Simmons.

Bates County, along with the rest of the state of Missouri, is represented in the U.S. Senate by Josh Hawley (R-Columbia) and Roy Blunt (R-Strafford).

Blunt was elected to a second term in 2016 over then-Missouri Secretary of State Jason Kander.

Political culture

At the presidential level, Bates County has become solidly Republican in recent years. Bates County strongly favored Donald Trump in both 2016 and 2020. Bill Clinton was the last Democratic presidential nominee to carry Bates County in 1996 with a plurality of the vote, and a Democrat hasn't won majority support from the county's voters in a presidential election since Jimmy Carter in 1976.

Like most rural areas throughout Missouri, voters in Bates County generally adhere to socially and culturally conservative principles which tend to influence their Republican leanings, at least on the state and national levels. Despite Bates County's longstanding tradition of supporting socially conservative platforms, voters in the county have a penchant for advancing populist causes. In 2018, Missourians voted on a proposition (Proposition A) concerning right to work, the outcome of which ultimately reversed the right to work legislation passed in the state the previous year. 75.43% of Bates County voters cast their ballots to overturn the law.

Missouri presidential preference primaries

2020
The 2020 presidential primaries for both the Democratic and Republican parties were held in Missouri on March 10. On the Democratic side, former Vice President Joe Biden (D-Delaware) both won statewide and carried Bates County by a wide margin. Biden went on to defeat President Donald Trump in the general election.

Incumbent President Donald Trump (R-Florida) faced a primary challenge from former Massachusetts Governor Bill Weld, but won both Bates County and statewide by overwhelming margins.

2016
The 2016 presidential primaries for both the Republican and Democratic parties were held in Missouri on March 15. Businessman Donald Trump (R-New York) narrowly won the state overall and carried a plurality of the vote in Bates County. He went on to win the presidency.

On the Democratic side, former Secretary of State Hillary Clinton (D-New York) narrowly won statewide, but Senator Bernie Sanders (I-Vermont) won a majority of the vote in Bates County.

2012
The 2012 Missouri Republican Presidential Primary's results were nonbinding on the state's national convention delegates. Voters in Bates County supported former U.S. Senator Rick Santorum (R-Pennsylvania), who finished first in the state at large, but eventually lost the nomination to former Governor Mitt Romney (R-Massachusetts). Delegates to the congressional district and state conventions were chosen at a county caucus, which selected a delegation favoring Santorum. Incumbent President Barack Obama easily won the Missouri Democratic Primary and renomination. He defeated Romney in the general election.

2008
In 2008, the Missouri Republican Presidential Primary was closely contested, with Senator John McCain (R-Arizona) prevailing and eventually winning the nomination.

Then-Senator Hillary Clinton (D-New York) received more votes than any candidate from either party in Bates County during the 2008 presidential primary. Despite initial reports that Clinton had won Missouri, Barack Obama (D-Illinois), also a Senator at the time, narrowly defeated her statewide and later became that year's Democratic nominee, going on to win the presidency.

Communities

Cities

Adrian
Amoret
Amsterdam
Butler (county seat)
Drexel
Rich Hill
Rockville
Hume

Villages
Foster
Merwin
Passaic

Unincorporated communities

 Altona
 Ballard
 Burdett
 Crescent Hill
 Hudson
 Johnstown
 Mayesburg
 New Home
 Nyhart
 Papinville
 Pleasant Gap
 Prairie City
 Sprague
 Spruce
 Virginia
 Worland

Townships
Bates County is divided into 24 townships:

 Charlotte
 Deepwater
 Deer Creek
 East Boone
 Elkhart
 Grand River
 Homer
 Howard
 Hudson
 Lone Oak
 Mingo
 Mound
 Mount Pleasant
 New Home
 Osage
 Pleasant Gap
 Prairie
 Rockville
 Shawnee
 Spruce
 Summit
 Walnut
 West Boone
 West Point

Notable people

 Robert Heinlein, science fiction author who was born and lived in Butler, mentioned the town in his short story "Requiem" and the novel To Sail Beyond the Sunset, in which the main character mentions the town several times
 Howard Maple, professional athlete in American football and baseball
 Charles O'Rear, photographer and author best known for his photo Bliss, the default wallpaper of Windows XP
 Stan Wall, former Major League Baseball pitcher for the Los Angeles Dodgers
 Warren Welliver, Missouri Supreme Court Justice (1979–1989)

See also
National Register of Historic Places listings in Bates County, Missouri

References

External links
Bates County website
Digitized 1930 Plat Book of Bates County  from University of Missouri Division of Special Collections, Archives, and Rare Books
"Battle of Island Mound State Historic Site", Missouri State Parks
" 'The Battle of Island Mound' wins two Emmy Awards from NATAS Mid-American Chapter", 7 October 2015 Press Release, Missouri Department of Natural Resources

 
1841 establishments in Missouri
Missouri counties